Should a Doctor Tell? is a 1930 British drama film directed by H. Manning Haynes and starring Basil Gill, Norah Baring and Maurice Evans. The screenplay concerns a doctor who agonises over whether to tell his son that the woman he is marrying is pregnant by another man, which would mean breaking the hypocratic oath.

It was produced as a quota quickie at Beaconsfield Studios by British Lion.

Cast
 Basil Gill as Dr. Bruce Smith
 Norah Baring as Joan Murray
 Maurice Evans as Roger Smith
 Gladys Jennings as The wife
 Anna Neagle as Muriel Ashton
 A. G. Poulton as Judge
 Harvey Braban as Prosecution

References

Bibliography
 Chibnall, Steve. Quota Quickies: The Birth of the British 'B' Film. British Film Institute, 2007.
 Low, Rachael. Filmmaking in 1930s Britain. George Allen & Unwin, 1985.
 Wood, Linda. British Films, 1927-1939. British Film Institute, 1986.

External links

1930 films
1930 drama films
Films directed by H. Manning Haynes
British drama films
Quota quickies
Films shot at Beaconsfield Studios
British Lion Films films
British black-and-white films
1930s English-language films
1930s British films